Carlos Linaris (born 1951) is a Uruguayan former professional footballer who played as a midfielder.

Playing career
When he became 17 years he began his career playing for Rampla Juniors in the first division of Uruguay. In the club of Montevideo played for four years. In 1971 he moved in Greece to play for Panathinaikos. In 1973 he returned to Rampla Juniors and was selected from University of Uruguay playing even parties in Paris. Andrés Prieto recommended Linaris to play for Club de Deportes Green Cross in Chile. He played for two years between 1975 and 1976.

Next year he played for Lota Schwager, requested by Vicente Cantatore and he made his debut on 6 February for the Copa Chile against Huachipato. The 6th place in the first division was the best run in the team's history and Linaris was one of the best players of the coal team. The following year participated in almost all the games of Lota Schwager and was also scored three goals against Rangers de Talca.

Managerial career
Linaris started a Coach career in Costa Rica where he has been coach of Deportivo Saprissa, Santos de Guápiles, Herediano and Cartaginés. With Saprissa he played in the final of the Inter-American Cup against Universidad Católica.

References

External links 
nacion.com Carlos Linares advierte en Uruguay que es ‘jodido’ ganar en Costa Rica 

1951 births
Living people
Uruguayan footballers
Association football midfielders
Uruguayan people of Greek descent
Rampla Juniors players
Panathinaikos F.C. players
Naturalized citizens of Greece
Greek people of Uruguayan descent
Uruguayan football managers
River Plate Montevideo managers
Deportivo Saprissa managers
C.S. Herediano managers
Uruguayan expatriate footballers
Uruguayan expatriate football managers
Uruguayan expatriate sportspeople in Greece
Expatriate footballers in Greece
Uruguayan expatriate sportspeople in Costa Rica
Expatriate football managers in Costa Rica
Rampla Juniors managers